Tonglu (3036 m amsl) is the one of the higher peaks of the Singalila Ridge and a small settlement inside the Singalila National Park in the Darjeeling subdivision, Darjeeling district in the state of West Bengal in India near the India - Nepal border. It is a roadside halt along the trekking route from Manebhanjan to Sandakphu.

It was also known as Tonglo in the 1800s.

Sir Joseph Dalton Hooker carried out many plant hunting expeditions in Darjeeling and Sikkim.

Geography

Location

Area overview
The map alongside shows the northern portion of the Darjeeling Himalayan hill region. In Darjeeling Sadar subdivision 61% of the total population lives in the rural areas and 39% of the population lives in the urban areas. There are 78 tea gardens/ estates (the figure varies slightly according to different sources), producing and largely exporting Darjeeling tea in the district. It engages a large proportion of the population directly/ indirectly. Some tea gardens were identified in the 2011 census as census towns or villages. Such places are marked in the map as CT (census town) or R (rural/ urban centre). Specific tea estate pages are marked TE.

Note: The map alongside presents some of the notable locations in the subdivision. All places marked in the map are linked in the larger full screen map.

Gallery

References

External links 

 About Tonglu from North Bengal Tourism 

Villages in Darjeeling district
Mountains of West Bengal
Biodiversity Heritage Sites of India
Geography of Darjeeling district